Leslie Frank Odell (4 January 1903 – 20 May 1955) was an English footballer who played as a full-back.

Club career
Odell started his career with Luton Town before joining Chelsea in 1924. He made his debut in a 3–3 draw with Barnsley, and in doing so became the 150th player to represent the club. After eleven years with Chelsea, Odell returned to Bedfordshire to sign with non-league Bedford Town.

References

1903 births
1955 deaths
People from Sandy, Bedfordshire
English footballers
Association football defenders
Biggleswade Town F.C. players
Luton Town F.C. players
Chelsea F.C. players
Bedford Town F.C. players